The Balukhand-Konark Wildlife Sanctuary is a wildlife sanctuary located in the Indian state of Odisha.

The sanctuary has an area of 87 km², and is located along the Bay of Bengal coast, between the towns of Puri and Konark. The sanctuary includes sandy beaches, coastal dunes, groves of introduced Casuarina trees planted in 1916–17, and cashew plantations. Little of the native flora remains. The sanctuary was designated in 1984. This place is extremely suitable for the development of ecological tourism.

The sanctuary is home to a herd of Blackbuck and Spotted Deer. Other animals found in the sanctuary include monkey, squirrel, jungle cat, hyena, jackal, mongoose and variety of birds and reptiles. Olive ridley sea turtles nest on the beaches.

References

External links 

Odisha semi-evergreen forests
Wildlife sanctuaries in Odisha
Tourist attractions in Puri district
Protected areas established in 1984
1984 establishments in Orissa